The China national under-17 basketball team is the national basketball team of the People's Republic of China and is governed by the Chinese Basketball Association 
It represents the country in international under-17 and under-16 (under age 17 and under age 16) basketball competitions.

As reigning champion of Asia, China achieved the 7th place at every FIBA Under-17 World Championship where it left behind competition from Europe and America. No other Asian nation has ever accomplished this.

Head coach position
 Jizeng Liu – (2013)

See also
China national basketball team
China national under-19 basketball team
China women's national under-17 basketball team

References

under
Men's national under-17 basketball teams